Kurunegala Youth Cricket Club is a first-class cricket team in Sri Lanka. They made their first-class debut in 1991 against Tamil Union Cricket and Athletic Club at Nondescripts Cricket Club Ground in Colombo.

In the 1993/94 season, they were bowled out for 31 runs in one of their innings in a match against Sinhalese Sports Club, the joint-lowest total in a first-class match in Sri Lanka.

See also
 List of Sri Lankan cricket teams

References

Sri Lankan first-class cricket teams